Muhammad Wajahat was a Pakistani politician who was a member of the Provincial Assembly of Sindh from August to November 2018.

Early life and education
He was born on 15 December 1970 in Karachi, Pakistan.

He did B.Com from the Karachi University.

Political career
He had been associated with Muttahida Qaumi Movement (MQM since mid-1990s.

He was serving as “joint in-charge” of Korangi town of the MQM before getting elected to the Provincial Assembly of Sindh as a candidate of MQM from Constituency PS-94 (Korangi Karachi-III) in 2018 Pakistani general election.

He died in on 27 November 2018.

References

1970 births
2018 deaths
Muttahida Qaumi Movement MPAs (Sindh)